The 2020–21 High Point Panthers men's basketball team represented High Point University in the 2020–21 NCAA Division I men's basketball season. The Panthers, led by third-year head coach Tubby Smith, played their home games at the Millis Athletic Convocation Center in High Point, North Carolina, as members of the Big South Conference. This was the Panthers' final season at the Millis Center, with the new Qubein Center opening for 2021–22.

Previous season
The Panthers finished the 2019–20 season 9–23, 6–12 in Big South play to finish in a tie for tenth place. They lost in the first round of the Big South tournament to USC Upstate.

Roster

Schedule and results

|-
!colspan=12 style=| Non-conference regular season

|-
!colspan=12 style=| Big South tournament
|-

|-

Source

References

High Point Panthers men's basketball seasons
High Point Panthers
High Point Panthers men's basketball
High Point Panthers men's basketball